Lapazina is a genus of longhorn beetles of the subfamily Lamiinae, containing the following species:

 Lapazina discicollis (Bates, 1881)
 Lapazina fuscipennis (Bates, 1881)

References

Hemilophini